Sphallotrichus spadiceus is a species of beetle in the family Cerambycidae. It was described by Gahan in 1892. It is known from eastern and southeastern Brazil.

References

Cerambycini
Beetles described in 1892